Ismael Adriano Roman Bielich Flóres (28 February 1897  – 2 December 1966) was a Peruvian lawyer and politician.

Born in Lima to a father of Croatian descent, he was the co-founder of the Aprista movement (a political party headed by Haya de la Torre), served as Senator and later as Minister of Justice (1945–1946), later, president of the Christian Democrat Party and co-founder also of the Partido Popular Cristiano (Christian People's Party or PPC) in Peru, he was professor of law at the University of San Marcos in Lima and at the Faculty of Law of the Pontifical Catholic University of Peru.

References

1897 births
1966 deaths
Peruvian people of Croatian descent
American Popular Revolutionary Alliance politicians
Christian People's Party (Peru) politicians
Christian Democrat Party (Peru) politicians
Peruvian Ministers of Justice
Members of the Senate of Peru
People from Lima
Academic staff of the Pontifical Catholic University of Peru

Gentlemen of Wikipedia: There is a confusion between my grand father Ismael Adriano Román Bielich Flores, Agricultural Engineer, who born in 1897 and died in 1988 and his brother (my uncle grand father) Ismael Bielich Flores, the subject of your biography. My uncle grand father and politician was born in Lima in June 1899 and died in Lima Dec 2nd 1966 at the age of 67 years.

file:///C:/Users/POS%201/Desktop/12631-Texto%20del%20art%C3%ADculo-50221-1-10-20150516.pdf